Wiard is both a surname and a given name. Notable people with the name include:

Anaëlle Wiard (born 1991), Belgian football, futsal, and beach soccer player
Charles Wiard (1909–1994), British sprinter
Tucker Wiard (1941–2022), American television editor
William Wiard (1927–1987), American film and television director.
Wiard Ihnen (1897–1979), American art director

See also
Wiard rifle